Kerygma (from the ancient Greek word  kérugma) is a Greek word used in the New Testament for "proclamation" (see Luke 4:18-19, Romans 10:14, Gospel of Matthew 3:1). It is related to the Greek verb  (kērússō), literally meaning "to cry or proclaim as a herald" and being used in the sense of "to proclaim, announce, preach". Amongst biblical scholars, the term has come to mean the core of the early church's teaching about Jesus.

Origins
"Kerygmatic" is sometimes used to express the message of Jesus' whole ministry, as "a proclamation addressed not to the theoretical reason, but to the hearer as a self"; as opposed to the didactic use of Scripture that seeks understanding in the light of what is taught. The meaning of the crucifixion is central to this concept.

During the mid-20th century, when the literary genre of the New Testament gospels was under debate, scholars like C. H. Dodd and Rudolf Bultmann suggested that the gospels were of a genre unique in the ancient world. They called the genre kerygma and described it as a later development of preaching that had taken a literary form.  Scholarship since then has found problems with Bultmann's theory, but in Biblical and theological discussions, the term kerygma has come to denote the irreducible essence of Christian apostolic preaching.

The ancient Christian kerygma as summarized by Dodd from Peter's speeches in the New Testament Book of Acts was:
The Age of Fulfillment has dawned, the "latter days" foretold by the prophets.
This has taken place through the birth, life, ministry, death and resurrection of Jesus Christ.
By virtue of the resurrection, Jesus has been exalted at the right hand of God as Messianic head of the new Israel.
The Holy Spirit in the church is the sign of Christ's present power and glory.
The Messianic Age will reach its consummation in the return of Christ.
An appeal is made for repentance with the offer of forgiveness, the Holy Spirit, and salvation.

In the 4th century, the kerygma was formally published in the Nicene Creed.

New Testament
The New Testament is a collection of early Christian writings taken to be holy scripture. 
The promises of God made in the Old Testament have now been fulfilled with the coming of Jesus, the Messiah (Book of Acts 2:30; 3:19, 24, 10:43; 26:6-7, 22; Epistle to the Romans 1:2-4; 1 Timothy 3:16; Epistle to the Hebrews1:1-2; 1 Peter 1:10-12; 2 Peter 1:18-19).
Jesus was anointed by God at his baptism as Messiah (Acts 10:38).
Jesus began his ministry in Galilee after his baptism (Acts 10:37), doing mighty works by the power of God (Mk 10:45; Acts 2:22; 10:38).
The Messiah was crucified according to the purpose of God (Mk 10:45; Jn 3:16; Acts 2:23; 3:13-15, 18; 4:11; 10:39; 26:23; Ro 8:34; 1 Corinthians 1:17-18; 15:3; Galatians 1:4; Heb 1:3; 1Peter 1:2, 19; 3:18; 1 Jn 4:10).
He was raised from the dead and appeared to his disciples (Acts 2:24, 31–32; 3:15, 26; 10:40-41; 17:31; 26:23; Ro 8:34; 10:9; 1Co 15:4-7, 12ff.; 1 Thessalonians 1:10; 1Tim 3:16; 1Peter 1:2, 21; 3:18, 21). 	
Jesus was exalted by God  (Acts 2:25-29, 33–36; 3:13;  Rom 8:34; 10:9; 1Tim 3:16; Heb 1:3; 1Peter 3:22) to be the Lord (Acts 10:36; Rom 10:9).
He will bring the Holy Spirit to form the new community of God (Ac 1:8; 2:14-18, 33, 38–39; 10:44-47; 1Peter 1:12). 	
He will come again for judgment and the restoration of all things (Ac 3:20-21; 10:42; 17:31; 1Co 15:20-28; 1Th 1:10). 	
All who hear the message should repent and be baptized (Ac 2:21, 38; 3:19; 10:43, 47–48; 17:30; 26:20; Ro 1:17; 10:9; 1Pe 3:21).

See also

 Clementine literature
 Evangelism
 Neo-orthodoxy

References

External links
 

Christian terminology
Homiletics